The 1900 Wisconsin Badgers football team represented the University of Wisconsin in the 1900 Western Conference football season. Led by fifth-year head coach Philip King, the Badgers compiled an overall record of 8–1 with a mark of 2–1 in conference play, placing third in the Western Conference. The team's captain was Al Chamberlain.

Schedule

References

Wisconsin
Wisconsin Badgers football seasons
Wisconsin Badgers football